Valle Mosso was a comune (municipality) in the Province of Biella in the Italian region Piedmont, located about  northeast of Turin,  northwest of Milan and  northeast of Biella.  it had a population of 3,965 and an area of .

Physical geography 
Valle Mosso bordered the following municipalities: Bioglio, Campiglia Cervo, Mosso, Pettinengo, Piedicavallo, Strona, Trivero, Vallanzengo, Valle San Nicolao, Veglio.

As a comune it had the following frazioni: Campore, Crocemosso, Falcero, Frignocca, Gallo, Orcurto, Ormezzano, Piana, Picco, Prelle, Premarcia, Simone, Torello

History 
From 1 January 2019 Valle Mosso was absorbed by the new-born municipality of Valdilana.

Demographic evolution

References

Cities and towns in Piedmont
Former municipalities of the Province of Biella